Amblyseius ovalitectus is a species of mite in the family Phytoseiidae.

References

ovalitectus
Articles created by Qbugbot